Trinchesiidae is a family of sea slugs, aeolid nudibranchs, marine gastropod molluscs in the superfamily Fionoidea.

Taxonomic history
This family was reinstated as a result of a molecular phylogenetics study.

Genera 
Genera within the family Trinchesiidae include:
 Catriona Winckworth, 1941 
 Diaphoreolis Iredale & O'Donoghue, 1923
 Phestilla Bergh, 1874
 Rubramoena Cella, Carmona, Ekimova, Chichvarkhin, Schepetov & Gosliner, 2016 
 Selva Edmunds, 1964
 Tenellia A. Costa, 1866
 Trinchesia Ihering, 1879
 Zelentia Ihering, 1879

Genera and subfamilies currently brought into synonymy

 Narraeolida Burn, 1961 synonym of Trinchesia Ihering, 1879
 Toorna Burn, 1964: synonym of Trinchesia Ihering, 1879

References

External links